Sven-Erik Bäck (16 September 1919 – 10 January 1994) was a Swedish composer of classical music. He was born in Stockholm.

Bäck studied from 1939 until 1943 in the King's Music-Academy and from 1940 until 1945, was a composition student of Hilding Rosenberg.  He travelled in 1951 to have further studies with Goffredo Petrassi in Rome.

As of 1953 he was the leader of the chamber orchestra of the Swedish Radio Orchestra. He was also a member of string quartets - the Kyndel Quartet from 1940 to 1944  and the Barkel Quartet from 1944 to 1953.

Bäck composed three operas, five works for ballet, many concertos, a number of works for chamber ensemble including at least four string quartets, an oratorio, cantatas, choral works, lieder and music for plays and film.

He died in Stockholm in 1994. He was 74

Works for stage and opera

 Tranfjädrarna (The Twilight Crane), Chamber Opera, 1956 
 Gästabudet (The Banquet), Chamber Opera, 1956
 Fågeln (The Bird), Chamber Opera, 1960

Chamber music

Chamber works other than piano solo works

String quartets (nos. 1 (1945), 2 (1947), 3 (1962), 4 (1984))
String quintet Exercitier (1948)
Sonata for solo flute, 1949
Sonata for two cellos, 1957
Decet for wind quintet and string quintet (1973)
String octet (1988)

Piano works

 Piano sonata (1942)
 Expansive preludes : for piano (1949)
 Sonata alla ricercare (1950) (recorded on MHS 3363, 1976 by Kjell Bækkelund, and on Roland Pöntinen's complete survey of Bäck's piano music for BIS)
 Sonata in two movements and epilogue (1984)

Orchestra

Concertos

Violin concerto (1957/1960)
Cello concerto (1966) 
Ciclos, piano concerto (1977)

Without soloist

String symphony (1951)
Chamber symphony (1955)
String symphony no. 2 (1986)

References

External links
Biography at STIM
Back page at Operone

1919 births
1994 deaths
20th-century classical composers
International Rostrum of Composers prize-winners
Swedish male classical composers
Male opera composers
Swedish classical composers
Swedish opera composers
20th-century Swedish male musicians
20th-century Swedish musicians